"Jika" (Zulu: "twist") is a song by South African house band Mi Casa. It was released as the lead single from their second studio album, Su Casa (2013). The song was the most played song for 12 straight weeks on several radio stations in South Africa, including Metro FM, 5FM, YFM, Ukhozi FM, Highveld Studio, and Gagasi 99.5 FM. It peaked at number 1 on BBC Radio 1Xtra, a digital radio station in the United Kingdom. The song also peaked at number 1 on MTV Base's Official SA Top 10 chart for the week of 31 October through 6 November 2013. Moreover, it peaked at number 1 on Trace TV's 30 Urban Hits.

Background and recording
J Something, the band's vocalist, told Showbiz.co.za that charting on BBC Radio 1Xtra was unreal.

Live performances
The band performed the song during their tour of several African countries, including Kenya, Swaziland, Angola, Botswana, Lesotho, Tanzania, Mozambique, Namibia, Nigeria, Uganda, and Zimbabwe. In September 2013, Mi Casa performed the song to celebrate the 10th birthday of the Cape Town International Conventional Centre. On 6 April 2014, the band performed the song at the Durban Botanic Gardens.

Critical reception
"Jika" received mostly positive reviews from music critics. A writer for Tunez.co.za said, "the track is very melodious and catchy which I believe made it excel commercially. The production is rhythmic, engaging and creative which achieves an exciting atmosphere (especially when the volume is turned up)." Red Flag said the song "brings the playful Mi Casa style to life with this sexy dance track that has already spawned a dance style of its own. The Jika dance has been seen becoming an audience participation favourite and bringing power to live shows." An unnamed writer for Rolling Stone SA described "Jika" as a "delightfully feelgood fable about keeping it real to get the girl of your dreams."

Accolades
"Jika" was nominated for Song of the Year at the 2014 Metro FM Music Awards. It was also nominated for Song of the Year at the 2014 MTV Africa Music Awards. Moreover, the song was nominated for Remix of the Year at the 20th Annual SAMAs.

Track listing
Digital download
"Jika" - 4:46
"Jika" (Radio Edit) - 3:46
The Remixes
"Jika" (Infinite Boys Urban Mix) - 6:36
"Jika" (Calvin Fallo Deep Jazzy Mix) - 5:38
"Jika" (Chymamusique Drum Remix) - 6:45

Charts and certifications

Weekly charts

See also
List of number-one singles of 2013 (South Africa)

References

2013 songs
2013 singles
South African songs
South African Airplay Chart number-one singles